Så skimrande var aldrig havet is an album from Norwegian singer Elisabeth Andreassen, including covers of songs by Swedish troubadour Evert Taube. The album was released in Norway on 15 September 1997.

Track listing
 Som stjärnor små
 Så skimrande var aldrig havet
 Fragancia
 Flickan i Havanna
 Dansen på Sunnanö
 I dina drömmar
 Brevet från Lillan
 Bibbi
 Stockholmsmelodi
 Pepita dansar
 Min älskling
 Morgon efter regn
 Så länge skutan kan gå

Chart positions

References

1997 albums
Elisabeth Andreassen albums
Covers albums